Fontenay-sur-Loing (literally Fontenay on Loing) is a commune in the Loiret department in north-central France. Ferrières–Fontenay station has rail connections to Montargis, Melun and Paris.

See also
Communes of the Loiret department

References

Fontenaysurloing